Blue Human Condition, also known as The Orgy Statue, is an outdoor sculpture by Mark Chatterley, located in Adrian, Michigan, in the United States. The city-approved sculpture was revealed in April 2014 near Adrian City Hall. Immediately following its unveiling, residents expressed concern over the sculpture. It was relocated to a less visible area of a park.

See also
 2014 in art

References

External links
 Adrian sculpture controversy by Christine Long (April 24, 2014), 13ABC
 Michigan Town Moves 'Blue Human Condition' Sculpture After Backlash, NBC News
 Photo Gallery: Family recreates “Blue Human Condition” in living sculpture by Erik Gable (April 27, 2014), Adrian Today
 Blue Human Condition to be moved to Yew Park (April 28, 2014), City of Adrian
 Williamston artist's 'racy' sculpture being moved away from Adrian city offices (April 29, 2014), Lansing State Journal

2010s controversies in the United States
2010s establishments in Michigan
2014 sculptures
Adrian, Michigan
Outdoor sculptures in Michigan
Statues in Michigan